The first election to Mid Bedfordshire District Council was held  on 7 June 1973, with the 49 councillors elected forming a shadow authority until 1 April 1974.  Mid Bedfordshire District was formed on 1 April 1974 as part of a general reorganisation of local authorities in England and Wales carried out under the Local Government Act 1972. The district was formed by the amalgamation of five districts:
Ampthill Urban District
Biggleswade Urban District
Sandy Urban District
Ampthill Rural District
Biggleswade Rural District

In 1973 Mid Bedfordshire had 62,423 registered electors, of which 57,527 were in the 23 contested wards. The turnout in the contested wards was 49%. Two wards (Henlow & Langford and Wrest) were uncontested.

Result

Ward Results
All results are listed below:

Figures on turnout were taken from Plymouth University's Elections Centre, which gives the number of registered voters, and the percentage turnout for each ward.  The number of ballots cast for each ward was calculated from these.

The percentage of the vote for each candidate was calculated compared with the number of ballots cast in the ward.  Note that in a ward with more than one seat, voters were allowed to place as many crosses on the ballot paper as seats.

Ampthill

Arlesey

Aspley (No 13)

Biggleswade (No 2)

Blunham (No 17)

Campton & Meppershall & Shefford (No 20)

Clophill

Cranfield

Flitton & Pulloxhill & Westoning (No 10)

Flitwick & Steppingly (No 11)

Harlington

Haynes & Houghton Conquest

Henlow & Langford (No 21)

Lidlington (No 15)

Marston (No 14)

Maulden

Northill (No 18)

Old Warden & Southill

Potton (No 24)

Sandy (No 3)

Shillington & Stondon

Stotfold

Wensley (No 25)

Woburn

Wrest

Notes

References 

1973
1973 English local elections